Terrence Jones (born 1992) is an American basketball player.

Terrence Jones may also refer to:

 Terrence Jones (athlete) (born 2002), Bahamian sprinter
 Terrence Jones (gridiron football) (born 1966), American football quarterback
 Terrence Jones (soccer) (born 1968), U.S. Virgin Islands soccer player

See also
 Terence Jones (1942–2020), Welsh comedian